Mersin Bus Terminus, also known as MEŞTİ for (, English: Mersin Intercity Bus Terminus Management) is the newly built bus terminus of Mersin, Turkey for intercity bus service. Opened on 28 February 2015, it replaced the former bus terminus, which served from 1986.

Location
The bus terminus is located in Çavuşlu neighborhood of Toroslar ilçe (intracity district).

Facility
The terminus complex was built by the Metropolitan Municipality of Mersin and it is owned by the operating company MEŞTİ, a subsidiary of the municipality. It was leased by MEŞTİ to a private company to  20 million (approx. US$7.7 million) annually for a three-year term.

It consists of three buildings. The building accommodates ticket offices of the long-distance bus companies and a shopping mall for passengers. The two other buildings of the terminus complex have a circular plan. One building serves as a bus station for short-distance busses while the other one is for the comfort of intercity bus crew.

The bus terminus has 46 platforms for departures situated in front of the west side of the main building, and 25 platforms for arrivals to its south. A parking lot capable of 1,000 cars is located east of the main building.

Controversy
Right after the opening of the terminus, intercity bus companies declared not to use the facility because they find the rent amount for their ticket office too high. After demolotion of the former terminus, the bus companies serve in provisory tents without entering the new terminus.

References

Buildings and structures in Mersin
Bus stations in Turkey
2015 establishments in Turkey
Transport infrastructure completed in 2015
Transport in Mersin
Toroslar District
Public transport in Turkey